Eugnamptus angustatus is a species of leaf rolling weevil in the beetle family Attelabidae. It is found in North America.

Subspecies
These two subspecies belong to the species Eugnamptus angustatus:
 Eugnamptus angustatus angustatus
 Eugnamptus angustatus testaceus Pierce

References

Further reading

 
 

Attelabidae
Articles created by Qbugbot
Beetles described in 1797